Adobe LiveCycle Enterprise Suite (ES4) is a service-oriented architecture Java EE server software product from Adobe Systems used to build applications that automate a broad range of business processes for enterprises and government agencies. LiveCycle ES4 is an enterprise document and form platform that allows capturing and processing information, delivering personalized communications, and protecting and tracking sensitive information. It is used for purposes such as account opening, services, and benefits enrollment, correspondence management, requests for proposal processes, and other manual-based workflows. LiveCycle ES4 incorporates new features with a particular focus on mobile devices. LiveCycle applications also function in both online and offline environments. These capabilities are enabled through the use of Adobe Reader, HTML/PhoneGap, and Flash Player clients to reach desktop computers and mobile devices.

The LiveCycle platform is made up of several integrated components and developer tools, some of which are discussed below.

LiveCycle ES4 components
LiveCycle ES4 components are various types of services available to developers including those needed to capture information, manage and optimize processes, secure information, invoke web services, create documents, and integrate with other applications and data sources. The components leverage shared "foundation" services which include administration and configuration services, service orchestration, invocation methods across components, and encryption services.

LiveCycle ES4 data capture products

LiveCycle Forms Standard ES4
LiveCycle Forms Standard allows users to create and deploy XML-based form templates as PDFs. Forms can be saved for offline use in Adobe Reader when they are reader-extended, a capability included in Forms Standard. LiveCycle Forms ES4 supports data-driven forms by merging XML content to create personalized renditions.

LiveCycle Forms Pro ES4
LiveCycle Forms Pro includes FormsStandard and adds the ability to render Mobile Forms for mobile devices using HTML5 and a forms management capability. Forms management allows business users to manage and deploy forms to a forms portal.

LiveCycle Data Services ES4
LiveCycle DataServices is a framework that simplifies the development of Flex and AIR applications. It includes functionality for messaging, remoting, data management, and PDF creation of rich Internet application (RIA) interfaces. It solves complex data management problems such as maintaining a single instance of data across the application. With LiveCycle Data Services, information can be synchronized across clients and applications, providing a framework for conflict resolution in real time. It can be used for real-time systems like data streaming in trading.

LiveCycle Reader Extensions ES4
LiveCycle Reader Extensions switches on functionality within the Adobe Reader on a per-document basis. When "Reader Extending" a PDF document, the user selects the capabilities they want to enable, then Reader would enable that functionality when opening the document or form. The user can select all or any combination of the following capabilities: commenting, import and export of form data, ability to submit outside of a web browser, enable database and web services capabilities, capture digital signatures, enable data capture in 2D barcodes and embed file attachments.

LiveCycle ES4 document security

LiveCycle Digital Signatures ES4
LiveCycle Digital Signatures automates electronic signature workflows for assurances of authenticity, integrity, and non-repudiation. Organizations can use this component to sign documents in bulk, such as university transcripts, government documents, annual budgets, grant approvals, or tax returns. This component will also validate previously signed documents in bulk. The digital signature capabilities are based on the functionality available in Adobe Acrobat and Adobe Reader on the desktop.

LiveCycle Rights Management ES4
LiveCycle Rights Management is an enterprise digital rights management (EDRM) product that provides data-centric security with user access and control policies to various types of data including PDF and Flash Video - and also native formats including Word, Excel, and PowerPoint. Rights management allows document "leasing" for a finite time before it has to reconnect with the server. The product also includes detailed audit trail reporting for rights-protected information, dynamic watermarking, expiration, and version control.

LiveCycle ES4 document generation products

LiveCycle PDF Generator ES4
LiveCycle PDF Generator is server-based software that automates the creation, assembly, and manipulation of PDF documents. It converts documents authored in native source applications such as Word, Excel, PowerPoint, and many others into PDF documents. It supports the creation of customized PDF document packages by assembling or disassembling existing PDF files or PDF pages and adding dynamic custom elements such as headers, footers, links, bookmarks, tables of contents, and watermarks. In addition, it can convert PDF to PostScript, image, or PDF/A formats for direct server-based printing or compliance with archiving requirements. There is also optical character recognition (OCR) functionality with this product to create searchable PDF documents from scanned images.

LiveCycle Output ES4
LiveCycle Output automates the generation of template-driven, final-form documents. It merges XML data with LiveCycle Designer templates to generate personalized documents in PDF, PostScript, PCL, or Zebra label formats. It includes capabilities to assemble or disassemble existing PDF files or PDF pages and supports adding dynamic custom elements such as headers, footers, links, bookmarks, tables of contents, and watermarks to create customized PDF document packages. It also converts PDF to PostScript, image, or PDF/A formats for direct server-based printing or compliance with archiving requirements.

LiveCycle Correspondence Management ES4
LiveCycle Correspondence Management centralizes the creation, management, and delivery of customized correspondence.  Personalized communications such as statements, letters, or notices can be created with a mix of custom-authored and pre-approved content and delivered through the customer's channel of choice.  The solutions can also increase organizational compliance, consistency, visibility, and control with templates, pre-approved content blocks, audit trails, and advanced archive searching.

LiveCycle ES4 ECM connectors
LiveCycle ES4 Connectors for ECM integrates other ECMs (enterprise content management systems) with LiveCycle for design time asset management and runtime process management. At design time, users can manage assets for the application including forms, fragments, images, and other content assets in the ECM system. Developers can then access those assets directly within LiveCycle Workbench ES4 for the creation of forms, documents, and packages. The connectors also enable business processes to retrieve content objects, as well as their content attributes or metadata directly from the ECM system. Specific ECM systems supported by these connectors include IBM Content Manager, IBM/FileNet content repository, Microsoft SharePoint, and EMC/Documentum's document repository. LiveCycle also provides native support for connecting to Adobe Experience Manager (AEM), its web content management (WCM) system.

LiveCycle ES4 tooling products

LiveCycle Workbench ES4

The primary development tool to create LiveCycle applications is LiveCycle Workbench. This is an Eclipse-based development environment that allows developers to create form templates and process designs that can be integrated with a variety of data sources and existing applications. It includes an integrated repository for collaborative development and simplifies deployment via an archive file that contains all of the assets associated with the application. The process design environment enables drag and drop of process services to create process workflows and also provides the ability for developers to save them as single WSDL-based components for other developers to use.

LiveCycle Designer ES4

Form authors and developers use LiveCycle Designer to build templates that merge with enterprise data to deliver interactive forms or personalized documents in a wide variety of electronic or print formats. LiveCycle Designer ES4 is included in every LiveCycle ES4 installation and embedded within LiveCycle Workbench ES4.

Adobe Flash Builder integrates with the LiveCycle ES4 environment. Using Flex Builder developers can create RIAs and create custom additions to forms created in LiveCycle Designer.

Implications for Document Management Systems
PDF documents restricted with LiveCycle DRM are sometimes impossible to use in non-Adobe document management systems because LiveCycle can prevent third-party software from disassembling the PDF, extracting pages, and displaying the contents. In these cases, if LiveCycle does not also prevent printing, users may resort to printing PDF documents from compatible Adobe software and scanning the printouts into unrestricted, rasterized PDFs that are usable in third-party software.

For example, a university admissions department unable to load an electronic transcript received from the National Student Clearinghouse, which allows client schools to restrict e-transcripts with Adobe LiveCycle, into admissions CRM software.

References

Adobe software
Service-oriented architecture-related products
LiveCycle